Benjamin Renner (born 14 November 1983) is a French cartoonist, animator and filmmaker.

Renner and his fellow producers received a 2014 Academy Awards nomination in the category of Best Animated Feature for the film Ernest & Celestine. He previously directed a short, La queue de la souris (The Mouse's Tail) in 2008.

In 2015 he published a comic, Le grand mechant renard (The Big Bad Fox), which he then adapted as a feature film released in 2017  - The Big Bad Fox and Other Tales....

Renner is currently directing an original animated film for Universal Pictures and Illumination, titled Migration, which is set to release on December 22, 2023.

Filmography
Ernest & Celestine (2015) - director
The Big Bad Fox and Other Tales... (2017) - director and writer
Migration (2023) - director

References

External links

Living people
French animators
French comics artists
French animated film directors
French animated film producers
1983 births